Georgina "Ina" Agnes Brackenbury (1 July 1865 – 27 July 1949) was a British painter who was known as a militant suffragette. She was jailed for demonstrating for women's rights. She followed Emmeline Pankhurst's lead as she became more militant (and lost former colleagues). Brackenbury was one of Emmeline Pankhurst's pallbearers. Her portrait of Pankhurst was bought by her memorial committee for the nation.

Life
Brackenbury was born at Royal Military Academy in Woolwich where her father, Major General Charles Booth Brackenbury who had been a Times correspondent before he was wounded was Director of the artillery college. She was brought up by Flora Shaw, a governess housekeeper - as Brackenbury's mother, Hilda Eliza, disliked houseFmotherwork. In 1890 the family moved to Kensington after the death of their father. Her parents both had artistic interests and in 1888 Georgina went to the Slade School of Art where she specialised in portraits as suggested by Hubert von Herkomer.  In time her sister Maria Brackenbury would follow her lead.

Georgina would mostly paint at home but she did hire a studio. In 1894 she created a portrait of Harold Dillon, 17th Viscount Dillon  who was the Chair of the trustees at the National Portrait Gallery. She exhibited at London galleries including the Royal Academy. Their mother had been interested in women's rights and in 1907 she joined the increasingly radical Women's Social and Political Union (WSPU). Quickly Georgina and Marie also joined the WSPU and they transformed their studios in Holland Park into classrooms where they could train women in public speaking.

Georgina and Marie were sentenced to six weeks in prison after they joined a WSPU stunt at the House of Commons. This was the "pantechnicon raid" when a furniture van (pantechnicon) was used as a "Trojan Horse" to get twenty suffragettes to the House of Commons. When they were close both Maria and Geiorgina joined the many who tried to rush their way into the lobby. They met surprised police who manhandled women to the ground, more than once, as they rushed to approach the doors.

Brackenbury's  imprisonment qualified her sister and herself to have a commemorative tree planted at the "Suffragette's Rest" in Somerset on 22 July 1910. The "Suffragette's Rest" was the nickname for Mary Blathwayt's home at Eagle House where her parents also indulged their WSPU enthusiasm. Her parents had set land aside to plant an individual tree for each WSPU member sentenced to prison. The planting was then photographed by Mary's father. The tree's and the photographs recorded their achievements.

Georgina allegedly informed Christabel Pankhurst that at a function she had heard senior police state they had been instructed by government not to let suffragettes be treated as 'political' prisoners. Her art studio, which she shared with her sister, Marie, in 2 Camden Hill Square was to be the secret locus for WSPU campaigner Marion Wallace-Dunlop to reveal the militants' campaign plans to new recruits in February 1912.

In 1912, her own mother, Hilda, was arrested for breaking windows. Her mother made the point that two of her sons had been killed in India on active service whilst she had little political rights to vote. Her mother served eight days on remand and fourteen days in jail despite being 80 years old. Her mother was asked to talk at the London Pavilion when she was released in April 1912.

Brackenbury died in St Mary Abbots in 1949, and her 2 Camden Hill Square, Holland Park home was left to a group providing clubs and hostel accommodation for women over thirty (the Over Thirties Association, founded 1934).  The Suffragette Fellowship marked the house with a plaque  stating "The Brackenbury trio were so whole-hearted and helpful during all the early strenuously years of the militant suffrage movement. We remember them with honour." She has portraits in the National Portrait Gallery including a painting of Emmeline Pankhurst which was bought by Pankhurst's memorial committee. An enamel plaque of the Brackenbury women including an image of a woman in a natural meadow scene, freed from chains by Ernestine Mills is in the Museum of London.

References

1865 births
1949 deaths
People from Woolwich
British painters
Eagle House suffragettes
Women's Social and Political Union